Shakti was a fusion band formed by English guitarist John McLaughlin, Indian violin player L. Shankar, percussionists Zakir Hussain (on tabla) and T. H. "Vikku" Vinayakram (on Ghatam) in 1974. The band played acoustic fusion music which combined Indian music with elements of jazz. The band's Hindi name means, in English, "creative intelligence, beauty, and power."

In addition to fusing American and Indian music, Shakti also represented a fusion of the Hindustani and Carnatic music traditions, since Hussain is from the north region of India while the other Indian members are from the South.

The group came together in 1974, after the dissolution of the first incarnation of the Mahavishnu Orchestra, and toured fairly extensively during the period 1975-1977; it made only sporadic appearances (with personnel changes) thereafter.

After 1977 the albums which L. Shankar recorded with Z. Hussain and T. H. "Vikku" Vinayakram stayed close to the music made popular by Shakti.
Some twenty years later McLaughlin and Hussain put together another band with the same concept, called Remember Shakti, including V. Selvaganesh (son of T. H. "Vikku" Vinayakram ), mandolin player U. Shrinivas and eventually Shankar Mahadevan.

Two concerts at the Montreux Jazz Festival (July 6, 1976 and July 8, 1977) are included among the 17 CDs of the box set Montreux Concerts by John McLaughlin.

Discography

References

External links 
 
 Shakti at Last.fm

Jazz fusion ensembles
World music groups
Musical groups established in 1975
Indian mythology in music